The National Company of Light Railways (abbreviated as NMVB; , abbreviated as SNCV) was a state-owned transportation provider which comprised a system of narrow-gauge tramways or local railways in Belgium, which covered the whole country, including the countryside, and had a greater route length than the mainline railway system.

The company gradually switched to buses and dismantled the tram tracks. Only the coastal line, the Charleroi metro, and the short line to the caves at Han-sur-Lesse are still in commercial use; four museums hold significant collections of rolling stock, including the museum at Schepdaal and the ASVi museum in Thuin. The longest and oldest (40 years) tourist tramway is the Tramway Touristique de l'Aisne (TTA), between Érezée and Dochamps. A sponsoring group called "Tramania" has supported various tramway preservation initiatives for 13 years, in particular by financing the construction of the Thuin museum and car restoration for TTA.

History

Legislation allowing the construction of rural tramways was passed in 1875, followed by a new law in 1885. The result was the creation of the nationwide operator named "National Company of Light Railways", known as Nationale Maatschappij van Buurtspoorwegen (NMVB) in Dutch and Société Nationale des Chemins de fer Vicinaux (SNCV) in French. Many lines were built alongside roads, and carried considerable quantities of freight (especially timber and agricultural produce) as well as passengers.

World War I and World War II saw greatly increased traffic despite some wartime damage. Starting from 1924, the NMVB/SNCV started to operate buses (either owned or hired). At this time, the electric tramway network was already  in length.

After World War II lorries, buses, and cars deprived the trams of much of their business. On several rural lines, passenger tramways were replaced by buses but SNCV/NMVB kept running freight trams until it wasn't profitable anymore. In 1977, the buses of the Belgian railways (SNCB/NMBS) were transferred to SNCV/NMVB. The tramways from Brussels to Wemmel,  and Grimbergen closed in 1978.

Political federalism within Belgium from 1980 onwards saw the splitting of many national institutions into separate bodies for Flanders, Wallonia, and the Brussels-Capital Region. SNCV/NMVB was broken up in 1991 into De Lijn (for Flanders) and TEC (for Wallonia), both companies were now primarily operating buses. De Lijn inherited the tram systems in Ghent and Antwerp (including the Pre-metro), operated previously by local companies MIVG and MIVA respectively, and the coastal tramway. TEC operates the Charleroi Pre-metro, which includes sections of Vicinal track. STIB/MIVB operates the  Brussels Metro, tram, and bus network.

Gallery

See also 
 List of town tramway systems in Belgium

References

External links

 Tramway Touristique Lobbes-Thuin
 Tramway Touristique de l'Aisne
 Photo archives of the Vicinal tramways
 Vicinal tram history and preservation activities
 Trambelgium (with NMVB/SNCV history)
 Tram Travels: Vicinal tramway (NMVB/SNCV)
 

Tram transport in Belgium
Interurban railways
Metre gauge railways in Belgium
3 ft 6 in gauge railways in Belgium